Stuckey may refer to:
 Stuckey, Georgia
 Stuckey, South Carolina
 Stuckey House, a historic home in West Virginia
 Stuckey's, an American roadside convenience store chain 
 Stuckey's Bridge, a bridge spanning the Chunky River near Meridian, Mississippi
 Stuckey and Murray, American comedy music duo
 Stuckey (surname)